Ballyogan Wood is a stop on the Luas light-rail tram system in Dún Laoghaire - Rathdown, south of Dublin, Ireland.  It opened in 2010 as a stop on the extension of the Green Line south from Sandyford to Brides Glen.  The stop provides access to the nearby residential area of Ballyogan.

Service
The stop is located at the side of Ballyogan Road and has edge platforms. To the north of the stop, trams continue along a section of reserved track at the side of Ballyogan Road on their way to Broombridge railway station. To the south, they turn to the left, crossing the M50 motorway on a bridge and re-joining an old railway alignment before continuing to Brides Glen.

Ballyogan Wood is also served by Dublin Bus routes 63 and 63A.

References

Luas Green Line stops in Dún Laoghaire–Rathdown
Railway stations opened in 2010
2010 establishments in Ireland
Railway stations in the Republic of Ireland opened in the 21st century